is a passenger railway station located in the city of Saijō, Ehime Prefecture, Japan. It is operated by JR Shikoku and has the station number "Y34".

Lines
Iyo-Komatsu Station is served by the JR Shikoku Yosan Line and is located 121.6 km from the beginning of the line at Takamatsu Station. Connections with other local or limited express trains are needed to travel further east or west along the line.

Layout
The station consists of two opposed side platforms serving two tracks. Track 1 is a passing loop and served by platform 1, attached to the station building. Track 2, served by platform 2, is a straight track. Access to platform 2 is by means of a footbridge. The station building is unstaffed and serves only as a waiting room. Parking is available at the station forecourt. There is also a refuge siding branching off track 1 which ends near the station building. Short stub sidings branch off elsewhere on both tracks.

Adjacent stations

History
At that time the station was operated by Japanese Government Railways, later becoming Japanese National Railways (JNR). With the privatization of JNR on 1 April 1987, control of the station passed to JR Shikoku.

Surrounding area
 Kōon-ji, 61st temple of the Shikoku Pilgrimage
Hōju-ji, 62nd temple of the Shikoku Pilgrimage
 Saijo City Hall Komatsu General Branch
Saijo Municipal Komatsu Elementary School
 Ehime Prefectural Komatsu High School

See also
 List of railway stations in Japan

References

External links

Station timetable

Railway stations in Ehime Prefecture
Railway stations in Japan opened in 1923
Saijō, Ehime